Defying Gravity is the sixth studio album by guitarist Vinnie Moore, released on July 10, 2001 through Shrapnel Records.

Track listing

Personnel
Vinnie Moore – guitar, mixing, production
David Rosenthal – keyboard
Steve Smith – drums
Dave LaRue – bass
Robert M. Biles – engineering
Paul Orofino – mixing
R.B. Hunter – mixing
Christopher Ash – mastering

References

External links
In Review: Vinnie Moore "Defying Gravity" at Guitar Nine Records

Vinnie Moore albums
2001 albums
Shrapnel Records albums
Albums recorded in a home studio